The spotfin shiner (Cyprinella spiloptera) is a species of ray-finned fish in the  family Cyprinidae. It is a small sized freshwater fish found abundantly in many watercourses of North America.

Taxonomy
Edward Drinker Cope described the spotfin shiner in 1867,  it is known also as the silver-finned minnow or the satin-finned minnow.

Description
The spotfin shiner has a black blotch of pigment on the membrane between its last three rays of the dorsal fin; this spot may be obscure or faint in small spotfin shiners. They are deep-bodied and have a black vertical bar posterior to their operculum. Their mouths open in the terminal position, they have diamond-shaped scales, and each scale is outlined with black pigment. Breeding males become heavily pigmented and steel bluish in color during late spring and early summer, and they have ventral fins that also become dull yellow to bright yellow. The head of spotfin shiners are covered with small tubercles, and they feel rough, almost like sandpaper. Spotfin shiners also have 37-39 lateral line scales. Spotfin shiners have eight anal fin rays unlike its close relative, the satinfin.

Distribution and habitat

Cyprinela spiloptera inhabit all but one of the Great Lakes (Superior), and are found from the Saint Lawrence drainage, Quebec to the Potomac river drainage, Virginia. They also inhabit areas from Ontario and New York to North Dakota, as well as south to Alabama and eastern regions of Oklahoma. C. spiloptera are also located in isolated areas of the Ozark mountains. C. spiloptera are freshwater, benthopologic fishes that prefer temperate climates. They inhabit sand and gravel runs and pools of creeks, as well as small to medium rivers with clear, permanent flow.

Feeding
Adult C. spiloptera prey on surface insects and immature aquatic organisms.

Conservation status
Currently, C. spiloptera are listed by the IUCN as having the least concern for conservation.

Life cycle and reproduction
The spawning season of C. spiloptera lasts from mid-June until mid-August. Adult females deposit their eggs inside small crevices of rocks and submerged logs or roots. Their eggs, which typically hatch in about five days, are defended by male. The maximum reported age of C. spiloptera is five years, but most usually only live to be around two years of age.

Etymology
Cyprinella is Latin for carp, and spiloptera is derived from the Latin words spilos, or spot and pteron, meaning wing or fish.

References 

Spotfin Shiner, image

Cyprinella
Taxa named by Edward Drinker Cope
Fish described in 1867
Freshwater fish of North America